Stian Heimlund Skjæveland (born November 19, 1973 in Stavanger) is a Norwegian representational painter and sculptor in the figurative tradition who also draws in black and white. He is inspired by the horizon, geometry and the tension between light and darkness (chiaroscuro).

Life and work
He has formal background from Kunstskolen i Bergen (The Art School in Bergen), Merkantilt Institutt (MI) i Bergen, and Tegne-og maleskolen i Bergen (Bergen Drawing and Painting School), Norway. After finishing formal education he independently studied the old masters such as Leonardo da Vinci, Titian, Caravaggio, Rembrandt, Johannes Vermeer, Diego Velázquez, Goya and J.M.W. Turner. Within a Norwegian context the mystical landscape visions created by Lars Hertervig has been closely examined.
As a creator of pictorials Stian has performed for the last 20 years, and has been purchased by Mayor`s office and Council chambers municipality of Strand, Norway.  The artist has in recent years simplified his paintings to achieve a more monumental expression. Stian Heimlund Skjæveland has his own gallery in a small former shipyard in Jørpeland Norway.

Exhibitions in Norway (selected),KulturnettGalleri Loyd f.o.m 01.11 - t.o.m. 03.12 «Separatutstillinger: […] Heimlund Skjæveland «Dreams» […]»  

R-Open, Rogaland
Lysefjord-Helleren, Lysefjorden
Galleri Sagholmen, Jørpeland
Ryfylke kulturfestival, Jørpeland
Galleri Motvekt, Stavanger
Dale's Galleri, Karmøy
Galleri F12, Stavanger
Galleri 1897, Kristiansand
Ryfylkeutstillingen, Strand, Hjelmeland, Forsand, Suldal, Finnøy
Spinneriet, Hjelmeland
Focus, Stavanger
Galleri OS, Sandnes
Galleri Loyd, Oslo
Galleri Skjæveland, Jørpeland

Work of embellishment 

The Museum of Archaeology, Stavanger, Norway
Mayor's office, municipality of Strand, Norway
Council chambers, municipality of Strand, Norway

Books 

The art book "Når Dagen Gryr", 1999  (Only in Norwegian)

References

External links 

Artist's webpage
Gallery Skjæveland 
Store Norske Leksikon (only in Norwegian)
Listen.no

20th-century Norwegian painters
Norwegian male painters
21st-century Norwegian painters
People from Stavanger
Living people
1973 births
20th-century Norwegian male artists
21st-century Norwegian male artists